MP 14 may refer to:
MP 14 (Paris Métro)
USAMP Colonel Horace F. Spurgin (MP-14)
Vehicle number plates beginning with MP-14 Mandsaur district
Lutetian